Kim Song-Gi (Korean: 김성기, Hanja: 金聖基, born October 23, 1988) is a North Korean footballer who plays as a defender for Tochigi City. He has represented North Korea at the international level.

Career statistics

Club
Updated to 23 February 2018.

National team

References

External links

 

Profile at Cerezo Osaka
Kim Song-gi at Footballdatabase

1988 births
Living people
Association football people from Hyōgo Prefecture
Association football defenders
North Korean footballers
North Korean expatriate footballers
North Korean expatriate sportspeople in Japan
North Korea international footballers
Japanese footballers
J1 League players
J2 League players
J3 League players
Cerezo Osaka players
Vissel Kobe players
Mito HollyHock players
FC Machida Zelvia players
Fujieda MYFC players
Tochigi City FC players
2019 AFC Asian Cup players
Zainichi Korean people